Dennis Morales Francis is a comic book creator, artist, and writer. He created the Jax and the Hellhound and Major Lancer and the Starlight Squadron comic series that were published by Blackthorne Publishing Inc. He also worked in advertising, film and television including Late Night with David Letterman.

Francis started as an apprentice to comics DC Comics legend Dick Giordano before working with his partner Neal Adams at Continuity Studios in New York City. He became one of the prolific writer illustrators during the heyday of black-and-white comics throughout the 1980s. His comics work usually centers on science fiction and fantasy.

Biography

Early life
Francis was born in Kingston, Jamaica in February 1957. His family immigrated to the U.S. in 1965. He took a keen interest in comics during his adolescent years while enjoying the works of Russ Manning, Gene Colan, Neal Adams and Dick Giordano. Dennis Francis made several attempts to break into the comics field during his high school years at the Fiorello LaGuardia School of Music and Art.

Career
At the end of 1975, Francis discovered advertising illustration and photography during his time at Pace University and soon gained employment in the newsroom of a local Brooklyn newspaper. He soon became an adept at publication design, photography and advertising design.

A chance encounter with the daughter of Neal Adams at a comic convention changed his life. During an impromptu interview with the comic book creator, he was given an opportunity to meet with Dick Giordano of DC Comics, who had been Adams is business partner for many years at Continuity Studios.
In 1981, after a brief period of working with Mr. Giordano an opportunity arose to work in the advertising art studio with Mr. Adams and the choice had to be made then and there. Francis began working as a commercial illustrator with Continuity Studios creating storyboards for award-winning commercials. Throughout that period he also had opportunities to work on merchandising comics for the company as well as animatics and concept art.

In 1984, another fateful encounter during a speech given at a Graphic Artists Guild Seminar led to an offer to work with Late Night with David Letterman show on NBC. The job entailed the creation of comic book characters Frank and Fred along with cartoon and comic illustration for the props. The project led to a two-year association with the show.

During the NBC years, Francis also worked with DC comics as an illustrator of their merchandising. He was soon tapped to work with Joe Giella and Bob Lappan on a series of activity books in the under served children's market as well as the Superman Sunday comic strips. Francis was included in a project to design and implement a comic book for Nancy Reagan’s “Just Say No” campaign.
1986 was another influential year when a chance meeting with Steve Shanes, the publisher of Blackthorne comics made him an offer he couldn't refuse. Francis was given the task of visualizing hundreds of characters for the Blackthorne universe. During the height of the black-and-white comic book explosion, Francis collaborated with writer, Mark Wayne Harris on the critically acclaimed Limited Series, Street Wolf.

Francis designed and penciled the graphic novel X-L, along with the three issue miniseries Locke. When asked what projects he wanted to personally produce and create for the new Blackthorne lineup, two projects that have been in the works for many years finally became real. Jax and the Hellhound, a proposed graphic novel became a three issue miniseries. The other project, major lancer and the starlight squadron was a holdover from a proposed comic strip he created during high school.

Shanes then commissioned a series of children's activity projects starting with the “How To Draw” Series. The 3-D comics craze took hold of the consumers’ attention in early 1988 and Blackthorne publishing jumped into the fray. Francis designed and illustrated several projects including the Transformers 3-D three issue series.

From the end of 1988 to the middle of 1989 a series of unfortunate events brought his association to a close with Blackthorne Publishing as the comic book market finally burst its ever-growing bubble. The Blackthorne color line retreated back into the imagination of its creators but comic book legend Neal Adams once again made him an offer he couldn't refuse.

The New York office of Continuity Studios has created a West Coast branch and needed a manager; Francis saw this as an opportunity to work in Los Angeles close to the entertainment studios. His experience in advertising design and television entertainment was now going to be put to the test in Hollywood.

1994 saw the birth of T&D publishing; a publications consulting company that helps small business owners figure out how to use that newfangled invention that everybody was looking at called desktop publishing. With the proliferation of computers and digital printing, small business operations could have greater control of print communications.

By the year 2000, publication design became mostly digital design of the Web began to take more precedence in business communication. T&D Publishing became DiD Publishing as Francis began to work with online content and web design.

In 2008 he attended a comic convention in San Diego and was once again inspired to dust the cobwebs from his decade old properties. He had registered the domain name graphic-novels.com years before but now gave serious thought to going back to his first love, comics.

April, 2009 began work on several comic book properties for his new venture;Graphic-novels.com. Jax and the Hellhound, the Hit List, Dangerlove and the Starlight Squadron are currently in production for online release. New artwork and stories are currently appearing on the website in the first quarter of 2010 for Jax and the Hellhound.

Bibliography
Comics work includes:
 The Hit List, Web series
 Jax and the Hellhound, Web series
 Locke, Blackthorne Publishing Inc.
 Jax and the Hellhound Blackthorne Publishing Inc.
 Official To Draw Transformers Blackthorne Publishing Inc.
 Official How To Draw Robotech Blackthorne Publishing Inc.
 Official How To Draw G.I. Joe, Blackthorne Publishing Inc.
 G.I. Joe in 3D, Blackthorne Publishing Inc.
 Transformers in 3D, Blackthorne Publishing Inc.
 StreetWolf , Blackthorne Publishing Inc.
 X-L , Blackthorne Publishing Inc.
 Starlight Squadron , Blackthorne Publishing Inc.
 Superman Sunday Pages, (fill in) DC Comics
 DC Comics merchandising activity books, DC Comics
 Game Boy #2 - It’s A Small World After All, Valiant Comics
 Real War Stories #2, Eclipse Comics
 The Adventures of Frank and Fred, Late Night with David Letterman

Notes

References

External links
 
 Dennis Francis’ blog
 Company Website

American illustrators
Living people
1957 births